The Huichang Persecution of Buddhism was initiated by Emperor Wuzong (Li Chan) of the Tang dynasty during the Huichang era (841–845). Among its purposes were to appropriate war funds and to cleanse Tang China of foreign influences. As such, the persecution was directed not only towards Buddhism but also towards other religions, such as Zoroastrianism, Nestorian Christianity, and Manicheism.

Rationale
Emperor Wuzong's economic, social, and religious reasons for persecuting Buddhist organizations and temples throughout China were as follows:
 Economic reasons: In 843 the emperor's armies won a decisive battle against the Uyghur tribes at the cost of almost bankrupting the country. Wuzong's solution to the financial crisis was to go after the wealth that had been accumulated in the Buddhist monasteries. Buddhism had flourished greatly during the Tang period, and its monasteries enjoyed tax-exempt status. In 845, Wuzong closed many Buddhist shrines, confiscated their property, and sent the monks and nuns home to lay life.
 Social reasons: Confucian intellectuals such as Han Yu railed against Buddhism for undermining the social structure of China.  They claimed it eroded the loyalty of son to father, and subject to ruler, by encouraging people to leave their families and to become monks and nuns.  Once they had been ordained, they stopped engaging in economic activity such as agriculture and weaving, and live from the support of others. The persecution sought to return monks and nuns to the ranks of tax-paying commoners engaged in what was perceived to be more useful economic activity. Additionally, monastic money-lending, pawnbroking, and employment of slave labor were seen as inherently exploitative of the poor, with a decree in 713 stating, “it is claimed that the purpose of this generosity is to relieve the poor and orphans. But in fact there is nothing to it but excess and fraud. This is not a legitimate business.”
 Religious reasons:  While Wuzong saw Buddhism as a foreign religion that was harmful to Chinese society, he became a zealous follower of Taoism, a faith native to China.  Buddhism preached the attainment of non-birth or Nirvana, which its critics equated with death, while Taoism promised immortality, a notion that increasingly captured the attention of the emperor as he grew older.

An imperial edict of 845 stated the case against Buddhism as follows:

Events of the persecution 

The first phase of the persecution was aimed at purifying or reforming the Buddhist establishment rather than putting an end to it. Thus, the persecution began in 842 with an imperial edict declaring that undesirables such as sorcerers or convicts be separated out from the ranks of the Buddhist monks and nuns, and returned to lay life. In addition, monks and nuns were to turn their wealth over to the government; those who wished to keep their wealth would be returned to lay life and forced to pay taxes. During this first phase, Confucian arguments for the reform of Buddhist institutions and the protection of society from Buddhist influence and practices were predominant.

Gradually, however, the Emperor Wuzong became more and more impressed with the claims of some Taoists, and came to develop a severe dislike for Buddhism. The Japanese monk Ennin, who lived in China during the persecution, even suggested that the emperor had been influenced by his illicit love of a beautiful Taoist princess. As time went on, the emperor became more irascible and erratic in his judgments. One of his edicts banned the use of single-wheeled wheelbarrows, as they break up "the middle of the road," an important concept of Taoism. 

In 844 the persecution moved into a second phase, aimed at removing Buddhism altogether rather than the reformation of Buddhism. According to a report prepared by the Board of Worship, at the time there were 4,600 monasteries, 40,000 hermitages, 260,500 monks and nuns. The emperor issued edicts that Buddhist temples and shrines be destroyed, that all monks (desirables as well as undesirables) be defrocked, that the property of the monasteries be confiscated, and that Buddhist paraphernalia be destroyed. By the edict of AD 845, all of the monasteries were abolished with very few exceptions, with all images of bronze, silver or gold handed over to the government.

In 846, the Emperor Wuzong died, perhaps on account of the elixirs of life he had been consuming (although it is also possible that he was intentionally poisoned). Shortly after his death, his successor proclaimed a general amnesty, ending the persecution.

Persecution of other religions

In addition to Buddhism, Wuzong persecuted other foreign religions as well. He all but destroyed Zoroastrianism and Manicheism in China, and his persecution of the growing Nestorian Christian churches sent Chinese Christianity into a decline, from which it did not recover until the establishment of the Yuan dynasty. 

It most likely led to the disappearance of Zoroastrianism in China.
 
Chinese records state Zoroastrianism and Christianity were regarded as heretical forms of Buddhism, and were included within the scope of the edicts. Below is from an edict concerning the two religions:

Islam was brought to China during the Tang dynasty by Arab traders but had never had much influence outside of Arab traders. It is thought that this low profile was the reason that the 845 anti-Buddhist edict spared Islam.

See also
Buddhism in China
Four Buddhist Persecutions in China
Persecution of Buddhists

References

Sources

Chinese Manichaeism
History of Buddhism in China
9th century in religion
9th century in China
845
Persecution of Buddhists
9th-century Buddhism